ITQ may refer to:

Individual Transferable Quota - permits to harvest fish
QQQ - an Australian television station
In the United Kingdom, an NVQ in information technology, commonly known as ITQ
During a tendering process ITQ may refer to Invitation To Quote
Abbreviation of "Inside the Queensway", a colloquial term referring to the region in immediate proximity to Canada's Houses of Parliament. The term ITQ is used metaphorically to refer to issues and people directly involved with Federal politics in Canada.